The following events occurred in July 1962:

July 1, 1962 (Sunday)

 Rwanda and Burundi, the northern and southern portions of Ruanda-Urundi, were both granted independence from Belgium on the same day. Grégoire Kayibanda of the Hutu tribe was sworn in as President of Rwanda at Kigali, and Mwambutsa IV, who had reigned as the titular leader of the Tutsi tribe since 1915, continued as King of Burundi.
 The Treaty of Nordic Cooperation of Helsinki (signed 23 March 1962) came into force.
 Supporters of Algerian independence won a 90% majority in a referendum.
 Bruce McLaren won the 1962 Reims Grand Prix. McClaren of New Zealand, a former rugby player turned race car driver, finished the  course in 2 hours, 2 seconds.
 The first Canadian Medicare plan was launched in Saskatchewan, resulting in the Saskatchewan doctors' strike. Thousands of citizens joined the protests against compulsory health care ten days later.
 Relocation of the Manned Spacecraft Center from Langley Field to Houston, Texas, was completed.
 Julio Adalberto Rivera Carballo became President of El Salvador. He had been the only candidate in elections on April 30.
 Died: Bidhan Chandra Roy, 80, Indian politician and Chief Minister of West Bengal since 1948.

July 2, 1962 (Monday)
 Sam Walton opened the first Walmart store as Wal-Mart Discount City in Rogers, Arkansas, United States. By 1970, there would be 38 Wal-Mart stores. After 50 years, there were more than 9,766 stores in 27 countries, and 11,766 by mid-2019.
 Simulated off-the-pad Gemini ejection tests began at Naval Ordnance Test Station. Five ejections were completed by the first week of August. The tests revealed difficulties which led to two important design changes: the incorporation of a drogue-gun method of deploying the personnel parachute and the installation of a three-point restraint-harness-release system similar to those used in military aircraft. On August 6–7, representatives of Manned Spacecraft Center and ejection system contractors met to review the status of ejection seat design and the development test program. They decided that off-the-pad ejection tests would not be resumed until ejection seat hardware reflected all major anticipated design features and the personnel parachute had been fully tested. Design changes were checked out in a series of bench and ground firings, concluding on August 30 with a successful inflight drop test of a seat and dummy. Off-the-pad testing resumed in September.

July 3, 1962 (Tuesday)
 The 1962 World Artistic Gymnastics Championships opened in Prague and ran until July 8.
 France and its President, Charles de Gaulle, recognized the independence of Algeria, with the signing of the declaration at a meeting of the French Cabinet.
 The Chichester Festival Theatre, Britain's first large modern theatre with a thrust stage, opened. Laurence Olivier was the first artistic director.
 Gemini Project Office met with representatives of Manned Spacecraft Center's Flight Operations Divisions, McDonnell, International Business Machines, Aerospace, Air Force Space Systems Division, Lockheed, Martin, Space Technology Laboratories, Inc. (Redondo Beach, California), and Marshall Space Flight Center to outline the work to be done before final mission planning. A center coordinating group, with two representatives from each agency, was established.
 Born: 
Tom Cruise, American film actor known for Risky Business, Jerry Maguire and the Mission: Impossible film series; as Thomas Cruise Mapother IV, in Syracuse, New York
Thomas Gibson, American actor, in Charleston, South Carolina

July 4, 1962 (Wednesday)
 The Burma Socialist Programme Party was established by Ne Win's military regime.
 Born:  
Neil Morrissey, English comedian and actor; in Stafford, Staffordshire 
Pam Shriver, American tennis player, winner of multiple women's doubles championships with Martina Navratilova; in Baltimore

July 5, 1962 (Thursday)
 After Algeria's independence was recognized by France, the Oran massacre took place at Oran, the section of Algiers where most French Algerians lived.  The official estimate of the death toll was 20 French Algerians and 75 Algerians killed.
 The French Assembly voted 241–72 to remove the immunity against arrest and prosecution that former Prime Minister Georges Bidault had in April 1961, when he called for the overthrow of President Charles De Gaulle, clearing the way for indictment of Bidault for treason.  Bidault had fled to exile in Italy.

July 6, 1962 (Friday)

Irish broadcaster Gay Byrne presented his first edition of The Late Late Show. Byrne would go on to present the talk show for 37 years, making him the longest-running TV talk show host in history.
Martin prepared a plan for flight testing the malfunction detection system (MDS) for the Gemini launch vehicle on development flights of the Titan II weapon system. Gemini Project Office (GPO) had requested Martin to prepare Systems Division and Aerospace approved the plan and won GPO concurrence early in August. This so-called "piggyback plan" required installing the Gemini MDS in Titan II engines on six Titan II flights to demonstrate its reliability before it was flown on Gemini.
The fallout exposed 13 million Americans to radiation; regular monthly tours are now given of the crater, which ceased being radioactive after less than a year.
 Died:
Roger Degueldre, 37, former French Army officer who rebelled to form the OAS Delta Commandos, was executed by firing squad
William Faulkner, 64, American novelist and 1950 Nobel laureate

July 7, 1962 (Saturday)
 A Soviet Air Force Mikoyan-Gurevich Ye-152 set a new airspeed record of 2,681 km/h (1,666 mph).
 In Burma, the government of General Ne Win forcibly broke up a demonstration at Rangoon University, killing 15 students and wounding 27.

July 8, 1962 (Sunday)
 In the most important symbolic gesture of post-war French-German unity, President Charles de Gaulle of France and Chancellor Konrad Adenauer of West Germany, both devout Catholics, attended mass at the Reims Cathedral and prayed together.  The Cathedral was where the Emperor common to both nations, Carolus Magnus (Charlemagne in France and Karl der Große in Germany)— had been baptized at Reims.
 The 1962 French Grand Prix was held at Rouen-Les-Essarts and won by Dan Gurney of the United States.
 Born: Joan Osborne, American singer-songwriter; in Anchorage, Kentucky

July 9, 1962 (Monday)
The first two attempts at exploding a nuclear missile above the Earth had failed. Increasing radiation in some places one hundredfold, the EMP damaged at least ten orbiting satellites beyond repair.
 NASA scientists concluded that the layer of haze reported by astronauts John Glenn and Scott Carpenter was a phenomenon called "airglow." Using a photometer, Carpenter was able to measure the layer as being 2 degrees wide. Airglow accounts for much of the illumination in the night sky.
 American artist Andy Warhol first presented his Campbell's Soup Cans at the Ferus Gallery in Los Angeles.
 Died: Georges Bataille, 64, French philosopher and writer, of arteriosclerosis

July 10, 1962 (Tuesday)
 One of the spans in the Kings Bridge in Melbourne, Australia, collapsed after a  vehicle passed over it, only 15 months after the multi-lane highway bridge's opening on April 12, 1961. The collapse occurred immediately after the driver of the vehicle had passed over the span, and nobody was hurt.

 AT&T's Telstar, the world's first commercial communications satellite, was launched into orbit from Cape Canaveral at 3:35 a.m. local time, and activated that night. The first image transmitted between continents was a black-and-white photo of the American flag sent from the U.S. transmitter at Andover, Maine, to Pleumeur-Bodou in France.
 The All-Channel Television Receiver Bill was signed into law, requiring that all televisions made in the United States to be able to receive both VHF signals (channels 2 to 13 on 30 to 300 MHz) and UHF (channels 14 to 83, on frequencies between 470 and 896 MHz). The result was to open hundreds of new television channels.
 Francisco Brochado de Rocha was approved as the new Prime Minister of Brazil by a 215-58 vote of Parliament.
 Died: Tommy Milton, 68, American race car driver and first to win the Indianapolis 500 twice (in 1921 and 1923), despite being blind in one eye; shot himself twice after making funeral arrangements for himself; by suicide

July 11, 1962 (Wednesday)
 The first person to swim across the English Channel underwater, without surfacing, arrived in Sandwich Bay at Dover 18 hours after departing from Calais. Fred Baldasare wore scuba gear and was assisted by a guiding ship and the use of oxygen tanks.
 NASA officials announced the basic decision for the crewed lunar exploration program that Project Apollo should proceed using the lunar orbit rendezvous as the prime mission mode. Based on more than a year of intensive study, this decision for the lunar orbit rendezvous (LOR), rather than for the alternative direct ascent or earth orbit rendezvous modes, enabled immediate planning, research and development, procurement, and testing programs for the next phase of American space exploration to proceed on a firm basis.
 The capability for successfully accomplishing water landings with either the parachute landing system or the paraglider landing system was established as a firm requirement for the Gemini spacecraft. The spacecraft would be required to provide for the safety of the crew and to be seaworthy during a water landing and a 36-hour postlanding period.
 Born: Pauline McLynn, Irish comedian and TV actress known for Father Ted; in Sligo, County Sligo
 Died:
René Maison, 66, Belgian operatic tenor
Owen D. Young, 87, American businessman who founded Radio Corporation of America (RCA) and co-founded the National Broadcasting Company (NBC)

July 12, 1962 (Thursday)
 The Rolling Stones made their debut at London's Marquee Club, Number 165 Oxford Street, opening for the first time under that name, for Long John Baldry. Mick Jagger, Brian Jones, Keith Richards, Ian Stewart, Dick Taylor and Tony Chapman had played together for the group Blues Incorporated before creating a new name inspired by the Muddy Waters 1950 single "Rollin' Stone". The day before the concert, an ad in the July 11, 1962, edition of Jazz News, a London weekly jazz paper, had shown the drummer to be Mick Avory, who later played for The Kinks, rather than Chapman. Avory himself, however, would say in an interview that he did not play in the event.
 The first telephone signals carried by satellite were made by engineers between Goonhilly in the U.K. and Andover, Maine, in the U.S.
Representatives of Gemini Project Office (GPO), Flight Operations Division, Air Force Space System Division, Marshall Space Flight Center, and Lockheed attended an Atlas-Agena coordination meeting in Houston. GPO presented a list of minimum basic maneuvers of the Agena to be commanded from both the Gemini spacecraft and ground command stations. GPO also distributed a statement of preliminary Atlas-Agena basic mission objectives and requirements. A total of 10 months would be required to complete construction and electrical equipment checkout to modify pad 14 for the Atlas-Agena, beginning immediately after the last Project Mercury flight.
A technical team at Air Force Missile Test Center, Cape Canaveral, Florida - responsible for detailed launch planning, consistency of arrangements with objectives, and coordination - met for the first time with official status and a new name. The group of representatives from all organizations supplying major support to the Gemini-Titan launch operations, formerly called the Gemini Operations Support Committee, was now called the Gemini-Titan Launch Operations Committee.
 Born: Julio César Chávez, Mexican boxer, WBC champion at three levels (super featherweight, lightweight, light welterweight and welterweight) between 1984 and 1996; in Ciudad Obregón
 Died: James T. Blair, Jr., 60, Governor of Missouri 1957–1961, died along with his wife, of accidental carbon monoxide poisoning at his home, near Jefferson City, Missouri.

July 13, 1962 (Friday)
 Burmese leader Ne Win left the country for a trip to Austria, Switzerland and the United Kingdom, "for a medical check up".
 With his popularity declining, British Prime Minister Harold Macmillan fired seven senior members of his cabinet, including Chancellor of the Exchequer Selwyn Lloyd, the Lord Chancellor, the Ministers of Defence and Education, and the Secretary of State for Scotland. The move was unprecedented in United Kingdom history, and was followed by the firing of nine junior ministers on Monday. Liberal MP Jeremy Thorpe would quip, "Greater love hath no man than this, that he lay down his friends for his life." The British press would dub the event Macmillan's "Night of the Long Knives".
 Secretary-General of the United Nations U Thant arrived in Dublin, and paid tribute to Irish soldiers who fought in the Congo.
 AT&T President Eugene McNeely inaugurated international phone calling via satellite in a conversation with French Minister of Posts, Telegraphs, and Telephones Jacques Marette. On Telstar's next orbit, McNeely spoke with Sir Ronald German, the British General Post Office Director-General.
 Tests were conducted with a subject wearing a Mercury pressure suit in a modified Mercury spacecraft couch equipped with a B-70 (Valkyrie) harness. When this harness appeared to offer advantages over the existing Mercury harness, plans were made for further evaluation in spacecraft tests.
 To ensure mechanical and electrical compatibility between the Gemini spacecraft and the Gemini-Agena target vehicle, Gemini Project Office established an interface working group composed of representatives from Lockheed, McDonnell, Air Force Space Systems Division, Marshall, and Manned Spacecraft Center. The group's main function was to smooth the flow of data on design and physical details between the spacecraft and target vehicle contractors.
Born: Tom Kenny, American voice actor best-known as the voice of SpongeBob in over 250 episodes of the long-running cartoon SpongeBob SquarePants; in Syracuse, New York

July 14, 1962 (Saturday)
 A 1958 Pakistan law, banning all political parties, was repealed by a National Assembly resolution, amending the Constitution of 1962.  The only requirement was that a party could not "prejudice Islamic ideology or the stability or integrity of Pakistan, and could not receive any aid from a foreign nation.
 In the third match of the rugby league Test series between Australia and Great Britain, held at Sydney Cricket Ground, a controversial last-minute Australian try and the subsequent conversion resulted in an 18–17 win for Australia.
 Henry Brooke became the new UK Home Secretary in Harold Macmillan's reshuffled cabinet.
 The Miss Universe 1962 beauty pageant took place at Miami Beach, Florida, and was won by Norma Nolan of Argentina.

July 15, 1962 (Sunday)
 The 1962 Tour de France concluded in Paris, with Jacques Anquetil winning for the third time.
 The Washington Post broke the story of thalidomide tablets that had been distributed in the United States, in a story by Morton Mintz under the headline "Heroine of FDA Keeps Bad Drug Off Market". As a result of the publicity, more than 2.5 million thalidomide pills, which had been distributed to physicians by the Richardson-Merrell pharmaceutical company pending approval by the U.S. Food and Drug Administration, were recalled. Although thousands of babies were born with defects in Europe, the FDA identified only 17 known cases in the United States.
 Radiation killed all six animals, sent up 24 hours earlier by NASA, in the first test of whether astronauts could safely endure prolonged exposure to cosmic rays.

July 16, 1962 (Monday)
 French explorer Michel Siffre conducted a long-term experiment of chronobiology, the perception of the passage of time in the absence of information, staying underground in a cave for two months after entering.  While inside, he used a one-way field telephone to signal to researchers when he was going to sleep, when he was getting up, and how much time had passed between events during his waking hours.  He was brought back out on September 14, 1962, sixty days later; according to his diary, he thought only 35 days had passed and that the date was August 20.

July 17, 1962 (Tuesday)
 Major Robert M. White (USAF) piloted a North American X-15 to a record altitude of 314,750 feet (59 miles, 96 km), narrowly missing the 100 kilometer altitude Kármán line that defines outer space, but passing the 50-mile altitude mark that NASA used to define the threshold of space. The record of  would be set by Joseph A. Walker on July 19, 1963.
 The "Small Boy" test shot Little Feller I became the final atmospheric nuclear test by the United States.
 The U.S. Senate voted 52–48 against further consideration of President Kennedy's proposed plan for Medicare, government-subsidized health care for persons drawing social security benefits. Two liberal U.S. Senators had switched sides, preventing a 50–50 tie that would have been broken in favor of Medicare by Vice-President Johnson; as President, Johnson would sign Medicare into law effective July 30, 1965.
 Four years after the USS Nautilus had become the first submarine to reach the geographic North Pole, the Soviet Union reached the Pole with a sub for the first time, with the submarine K-3 (later renamed the Leninsky Komsomol). 
 The Eritrean Liberation Front staged its first major attack in seeking to separate Eritrea from Ethiopia, by throwing a hand grenade at a reviewing stand that included General Abiy Abebe (Emperor Haile Selassie's representative), Eritrean provincial executive Asfaha Woldemikael, and Hamid Ferej, leader of the Eritrean provincial assembly.

July 18, 1962 (Wednesday)
 Typhoon Kate formed a short distance from northern Luzon.
 Unpopular and unable to implement economic reforms, Ali Amini resigned as Prime Minister of Iran. He would be replaced by Asadollah Alam.
 The largest space vehicle, up to that time, began orbiting the Earth, after the United States launched the communications satellite "Big Shot".
 After Peruvian Army officers used a Sherman tank to batter down the gates of the presidential palace in Lima, they arrested Manuel Prado Ugarteche, the 73-year-old President of Peru, and replaced him with a junta led by General Ricardo Pérez Godoy. The election results of June 10 were annulled.
 The Minnesota Twins became the first Major League Baseball team to hit two grand slams in the same inning of a game, as Bob Allison and Harmon Killebrew drove in eight runs in the first inning of a 14–3 win over the Cleveland Indians. In 50 years, the feat has been accomplished seven more times since then, most recently on September 11, 2015, in the eighth inning of a 14 to 8 win by the Baltimore Orioles over the Kansas City Royals. On April 23, 1999, both of the St. Louis Cardinals' grand slams in the third inning were made by the same batter, Fernando Tatis.
 Born: Abu Sabaya, Philippine leader of rebel group Abu Sayyaf; as Aldam Tilao in Isabela, Basilan (killed 2002)
 Died:
Volkmar Andreae, 82, Swiss conductor and composer
Eugene Houdry, 70, French chemical engineer who developed high octane gasoline and the catalytic converter

July 19, 1962 (Thursday)
 The first successful intercept of one missile by another took place at Kwajalein Island, with a Zeus missile passing within  of an incoming Atlas missile, close enough for a nuclear warhead to disable an enemy weapon.
 Gemini Project Office and North American Aviation agreed on guidelines for the design of the advanced paraglider trainer, the paraglider system to be used with static test article No. 2, and the paraglider system for the Gemini spacecraft. The most important of these guidelines was that redundancy would be provided for all critical operations.
 Born: Anthony Edwards, American film and television actor; in Santa Barbara, California

July 20, 1962 (Friday)
 Government police arrested, tortured and killed Tou Samouth, Communist leader of the Khmer People's Revolutionary Party in Cambodia. His successor, Saloth Sar, would go on to lead the Communist Party of Kampuchea as Pol Pot, and then exact revenge on former government employees.
 France and Tunisia reestablished diplomatic relations, a year after breaking ties following the Bizerte crisis.
 The world's first regular passenger hovercraft service was introduced, as the VA-3 began the  run between Rhyl (in Wales) and Wallasey (in England).
 Executive Order 11307 was issued, prohibiting unlicensed U.S. citizens and people under U.S. jurisdiction, from possessing or holding an interest in gold coins from outside the United States, unless the coins were of "exceptional numismatic value".
 NASA Administrator James E. Webb announced officially that a new mission control center for human spaceflight would be established at Manned Spacecraft Center (MSC) in Houston. Project Mercury flights were controlled from the center at Cape Canaveral, but these facilities were inadequate for the more complex missions envisioned for the Gemini and Apollo programs. Philco Corporation's Western Development Laboratories, Palo Alto, California, had received a contract in April 1962 to study a design concept for the flight information and control functions of the mission control center. The U.S. Army Corps of Engineers would supervise construction of this center as it had all major facilities at MSC. The control center was expected to be operational in 1964 for Gemini rendezvous flights and to cost about $30 million.
 Born: Jeong Han Kim, South Korean mathematician; in Seoul

July 21, 1962 (Saturday)
 The United Arab Republic (Egypt) successfully fired four missiles which, President Gamal Abdel Nasser said, could strike any target "just south of Beirut", a reference to neighboring Israel. The missiles came as a surprise to Israel's intelligence service, the Mossad. In August, Mossad chief Isser Harel would report to Prime Minister David Ben-Gurion that German scientists were assisting in the development of 900 more missiles capable of carrying chemical and biological weapons and would organize Operation Damocles to target the scientists on the project.
 U.S. President John F. Kennedy announced that Robert R. Gilruth, Director of Manned Spacecraft Center, would receive the President's Award for Distinguished Federal Civilian Service. This award was made for his successful accomplishment of "one of the most complex tasks ever presented to man in this country. . . the achievement of manned flight in orbit around the earth."
 Died: G. M. Trevelyan, 86, British historian

July 22, 1962 (Sunday)
The Mariner 1 spacecraft flew erratically several minutes after launch and had to be destroyed after less than five minutes, at a cost of $4,000,000 for the satellite and $8,000,000 for the rocket.  The $12 million dollar loss was later traced to the omission of an overbar in the handwritten text from which the computer programming for the rocket guidance system was drawn, which should have been written as : being rendered as :; thus, there was no smooth function to prevent over-correction of minor variations of data on rocket velocity.
Canadian Pacific Flight 301 experienced engine problems on departure from Honolulu and returned to land on three engines, but crashed on the airfield, killing 27 of the 40 people on board.
Born: Steve Albini, American musician, audio engineer, and music journalist, in Pasadena, California

July 23, 1962 (Monday)
 Telstar relayed the first live trans-Atlantic television signal, with two 20-minute programs.  The first was a set of U.S. TV shows (President Kennedy's news conference, 90 seconds of the Phillies-Cubs baseball game, and the Mormon Tabernacle Choir) to Eurovision (2:00 pm New York, 8:00 pm London).  At 4:58 pm, New York Time, live transmission of European broadcasting was shown on all three American networks, beginning with a live picture of the clock at London's Big Ben approaching 11:00 pm.
In a press conference, broadcast by satellite for the first time, President Kennedy blamed the Soviet Union for the resumption of nuclear testing and the inflexibility about the Berlin question.
 The International Agreement on the Neutrality of Laos was signed in Geneva.  Under the agreement, all foreign military personnel were to withdraw within 75 days; the last Americans, advisers to the U.S. Special Forces, would leave by October 6.
While in Geneva, W. Averell Harriman of the United States met with North Vietnam's Foreign Minister, Ung Văn Khiêm in an unsuccessful attempt to talk about a similar neutrality agreement in Vietnam.  Decades after the end of the Vietnam War, sources in Hanoi would reveal that the North Vietnamese Politburo had approved the pursuit of discussions, but that Khiem had not been informed of the Politburo decision that might have averted a protracted war.  American and North Vietnamese diplomats would not meet again for six years.
The Saskatoon agreement brought an end to the Saskatchewan doctors' strike.
Thirty-six people were killed, and 100 injured, when a train between Paris and Marseilles derailed while crossing a viaduct near Dijon.  Most of the dead were vacationers traveling to the French Riviera, and were on a passenger car that plunged into a ravine.
 Born: Eriq La Salle, African-American TV actor; in Hartford, Connecticut
 Died: 
Henry Dworshak, 67, U.S. Senator from Idaho since 1949.  Dworshak was the fourth conservative Republican U.S. Senator to die in less than a year.
Victor Moore, 86, American stage and film actor best known for It Happened on 5th Avenue

July 24, 1962 (Tuesday)
 The first successful use of a biological valve in human heart surgery was performed by Dr. Donald Nixon Ross in London, with a subcoronary implantation of an aortic allograft.
In Geneva, after the ending of the conference about Laos, five Ministers for Foreign Affairs (the American Dean Rusk, the English Lord Home, the Canadian Howard Charles Green, the Soviet Andrej Gromyko and the Indian Krishna Menon) had a new meeting about the disarmament and the Berlin crisis. Notwithstanding the cordial atmosphere, no progress was obtained about the two questions.
In Italy, the government of Prime Minister Amintore Fanfani enacted the law for the school development, which provides for free textbooks for primary school students.
 Died:  
Victor Bourgeois, 64, Belgian modernist architect 
Margaret Buckley, 83, Irish Republican leader who served as President of Sinn Féin, Ireland's ruling political party, from 1937 to 1950

July 25, 1962 (Wednesday)
In Algeria, three weeks after independence, civil war broke out within the FLN between the GPRA and the Oujda group (Ben Bella and Boumédiène). Ben Bella's troops occupied Bona and Constantine, with bloodshed, while the GPRA held control only of the Algiers region.
 Buckingham Palace, residence of the Queen of the United Kingdom, was opened to the public for the first time with the dedication of the Queen's Gallery, an art museum.
 "Skyphone" service, permitting airline passengers to make telephone calls while in flight, was inaugurated. The first call was made from American Airlines Flight 941 en route from New York to Cincinnati, from stewardess Hope Patterson to the Associated Press.
 "Aid to Families with Dependent Children" (AFDC) was created with the passage of the Public Welfare Amendments of 1962 to the U.S. Social Security Act, increasing the number of people receiving federal public assistance.
 On July 25 and 26, a reliability review of the Titan II launch vehicle engine system was held in Sacramento, California, at Aerojet-General's Liquid Rocket Plant, the site where the engines were being developed. Gemini engines had to be more reliable than did intercontinental ballistic missile (ICBM) engines. This requirement meant supplementing the ICBM engine reliability program, a task being performed by Aerojet under Air Force Space Systems Division direction.
 The United States Army formed its first armed helicopter company, using UH-1 Hueys.
 The U.S. had another failure in its Operation Dominic series of nuclear tests, when a Thor missile exploded on the launch pad at Johnston Island. Although the 100-kiloton warhead was destroyed without a nuclear blast, the area was contaminated with plutonium, ending plans to routinely launch nuclear-powered space probes.
 Born: Doug Drabek, American Major League Baseball pitcher 1986-1998, and 1990 Cy Young Award winner; in Victoria, Texas.
 Died:
Christie MacDonald, 87, Canadian-American actress and singer 
Nelle Wilson Reagan, 79, mother of future U.S. President Ronald Reagan
Thibaudeau Rinfret, 83, Chief Justice of Canada from 1944 to 1954

July 26, 1962 (Thursday)
To celebrate the tenth anniversary of the founding of the republic in Egypt, President Nasser declared an end to tuition in the nation's universities.
The first phone call by satellite took place between Italy and the United States. Osvaldo Cagnasso, the mayor of Alba in Piedmont, called his counterpart, Mayor John Snider in Medford, Oregon. The mayors of the twinned cities exchanged their greetings, in the call relayed by Telstar 1, for 12 minutes. In the hours that followed, the satellite broadcast another 11 calls from one side of the Atlantic to the other.
 The first Soviet nuclear missiles were unloaded in Cuba at the port of Mariel; their discovery would precipitate the Cuban Missile Crisis.
 The French Chef, starring Julia Child, appeared on television for the first time, as a program on the Boston public television station WGBH.
The first birth defects in the United States from the drug thalidomide were detected. The unborn child's mother asked the Supreme Court of Arizona State for an order permitting her to abort her fifth pregnancy. In previous months, she had used the controversial medication, which was banned in the U.S., but had been bought by her husband in London. Her request was rejected.
In Algeria, during the split within the GPRA, Belkacem Krim and Boudiaf got the Kabylie to organize the resistance to Ben Bella's army. Benkhedda remained in Algiers to cooperate with the opposing faction. 
 Born: Sergey Kiriyenko, Prime Minister of Russia from March to August 1998; in  Sukhumi, Georgian S.S.R., U.S.S.R.
 Died: 
Matt Cvetic, 53, American government employee who infiltrated the U.S. Communist Party, then wrote about it in I Was a Communist for the FBI, died of a heart attack.
Raquel Meller, 74, Spanish singer and actress.

July 27, 1962 (Friday)
 Atlas launch vehicle No. 113-D was inspected at Convair and accepted for the Mercury-Atlas 8 (MA-8) crewed orbital mission.
 The Church of Jesus Christ of Latter-day Saints began its project to acquire and restore properties in the small town of Nauvoo, Illinois, where the Mormons had been centered from 1839 to 1844. Within a year, Nauvoo Restoration, Inc., had acquired 30 of the 35 buildings still standing in Nauvoo.
 Jess Oliver (Oliver Jsesperson) applied for the patent for the Ampeg B-15 Portaflex portable bass amplifier, which would become the most popular bass amplifier in the world for bands; the patent would be granted on May 11, 1965.
 Inventor David P. Wagner applied for the patent for the first pharmaceutical packaging designed for compliance with dosage directions, to simplify use of birth control pills on a specific date. Wagner would receive royalties from G. D. Searle & Company and from Ortho Pharmaceutical, who would use the design for their contraceptives.
Born: Mariela Castro Espin, Cuban sexologist, niece of Fidel Castro; in Havana
Died: Richard Aldington, 70, English poet and author

July 28, 1962 (Saturday)
 The Bundesliga, the national league of West Germany's top professional soccer football teams, was created by a 103–26 vote of delegates to the German Football Association (DFB) convention at Dortmund.  The Bundesliga would begin its first season on August 24, 1963 with 16 teams out of 46 applicants.
 Kosmos 7 was launched by the U.S.S.R., on the first successful Soviet mission to conduct surveillance photography of the entire United States.
 South Korea's President Park Chung Hee issued the memorandum "The Establishment of a Social Security System" and set about to forcibly implement programs for assistance for the elderly, disabled and unemployed in what was, at that time, a poor nation.
 Race riots broke out in Dudley, West Midlands, UK.
 The derailment of at Pennsylvania Railroad train at Steelton killed 19 people and injured 116.  The nine-car train was carrying baseball fans to the Pirates-Phillies baseball game at Philadelphia, when the last five cars went off track, and three fell down a 40-foot embankment.
 Born: Jason Sherman, Canadian playwright and screenwriter; in Montreal

July 29, 1962 (Sunday)
 Sir Oswald Mosley, who had founded the British Union of Fascists and been a vocal Nazi sympathizer prior to Germany's attack on Britain in World War II, was beaten by an angry crowd in Manchester, after leading members of his extreme right-wing Union Movement on a march through the city.
 A few weeks after Algeria had attained its independence, 2,000 rebel guerrillas under the command of Colonel Si Hassan seized control of Algiers.
 In the final of the 1962 Speedway World Team Cup at Slaný, Czechoslovakia, Sweden defeated Great Britain, Poland and Czechoslovakia.
 Born: Scott Steiner, American college and professional wrestler; as Scott Rechsteiner in Bay City, Michigan
 Died: Sir Ronald Fisher, 72, English biologist

July 30, 1962 (Monday)
 The Trans-Canada Highway was opened at a ceremony to mark the completion of the 92-mile-long Rogers Pass Highway through the Canadian Rockies, for the final link of the nearly 5,000-mile system between St. John's, Newfoundland and Victoria, British Columbia.  B.C. Premier W. A. C. Bennett snipped a ribbon near Revelstoke.
 U.S. President Kennedy agreed to halt reconnaissance flights over Soviet ships in the Caribbean Sea, after U.S.S.R. Premier Khrushchev proposed the idea "for the sake of better relations"; in the two months that followed, the ships delivered missiles to Cuba.
 On the same day, President Kennedy began tape recording conversations in the White House.
 Marilyn Monroe made a final telephone call to the U.S. Justice Department, six days before her death.  Monroe had been a regular caller to U.S. Attorney General Robert F. Kennedy, and historians speculate that he told her during the eight-minute phone call that they could no longer see each other.  Monroe's phone records would be confiscated by the FBI, but Kennedy's phone logs would be donated to the National Archives after his death.
 Born: Alton Brown, American chef and host of the Food Network show Good Eats; in Los Angeles
 Died: Helge Krog, 73, Norwegian journalist

July 31, 1962 (Tuesday)
 The Vietnam Era began for Australia, with the arrival of Colonel Ted Serong, followed by 30 advisers later in the week. Over ten years, ending on December 2, 1972, there would be 521 Australians killed in the war.
The eclipse lasted 3 minutes and 32.66 seconds at the point of maximum eclipse.
 The professional football career of Ernie Davis, who had been the #1 choice in the 1962 NFL Draft, ended three days before he was to begin play for the Cleveland Browns in the preseason College All-Star Game in Chicago. Davis had checked into the Memorial Hospital in the suburb of Evanston, Illinois, on suspicion that he had the mumps, and then with mononucleosis. The next day, it was announced that he had a "blood disorder", and in October, it would be revealed that he had leukemia, the disease that would claim his life the following May 18.
A symposium held at Langley Research Center (LaRC) on July 31 and August 1, attended by NASA people interested in space station work, provided a forum for Langley researchers to report on progress on some of the more significant aspects of the Center's work in the space station area. (A general research program to explore the technical problems of large rotating crewed spacecraft had been under way at the Center for some time.) Various researchers emphasized that such investigations were exploratory in nature, since there existed no NASA-approved program for the development and operation of such a spacecraft. The dozen papers presented at the symposium encompassed objectives and research guidelines for a space station; preliminary research configurations; structural requirements; power, life-support, and thermal-control systems; materials requirements and fabrication techniques; operational considerations; structural and dynamic compatibility between station and launch vehicle; and crew performance.
 Born:  
Luis Castiglioni, Vice-President of Paraguay 2003 to 2007; in Itacurubí del Rosario
Wesley Snipes, American film actor; in Orlando, Florida
 Died:
Niels Miller, 63, American inventor and founder of Miller Electric arc welding manufacturer
George Pepperdine, 76, American philanthropist and founder (in 1937) of Pepperdine University 

References

1962
1962-07
1962-07